Shiqiao station can refer to:
Shiqiao station (Guangzhou Metro), a metro station in Guangzhou, China
Shiqiao station (Wuhan Metro), a metro station in Wuhan, China